Orpheus (Ancient Greek: Ὀρφεύς,) in Greek mythology was a Thracian bard, legendary musician and prophet. He was also a renowned poet and, according to the legend, travelled with Jason and the Argonauts in search of the Golden Fleece, and even descended into the underworld of Hades, to recover his lost wife Eurydice.

Ancient Greek authors such as Strabo and Plutarch note Orpheus's Thracian origins. The major stories about him are centered on his ability to charm all living things and even stones with his music (the usual scene in Orpheus mosaics), his attempt to retrieve his wife Eurydice from the underworld, and his death at the hands of the maenads of Dionysus, who tired of his mourning for his late wife Eurydice. As an archetype of the inspired singer, Orpheus is one of the most significant figures in the reception of classical mythology in Western culture, portrayed or alluded to in countless forms of art and popular culture including poetry, film, opera, music, and painting.

For the Greeks, Orpheus was a founder and prophet of the so-called "Orphic" mysteries. He was credited with the composition of the  Orphic Hymns and the Orphic Argonautica. Shrines containing purported relics of Orpheus were regarded as oracles.

Etymology
Several etymologies for the name Orpheus have been proposed. A probable suggestion is that it is derived from a hypothetical PIE root  'orphan, servant, slave' and ultimately the verb root  'to change allegiance, status, ownership.'

Fulgentius, a mythographer of the late 5th to early 6th century AD, gave the unlikely etymology meaning "best voice," "Oraia-phonos".

Background

It was believed by Aristotle that Orpheus never existed. But to all other ancient writers, he was a real person, though living in remote antiquity. Most of them believed that he lived several generations before Homer. The earliest literary reference to Orpheus is a two-word fragment of the 6th century BC lyric poet Ibycus:  ('Orpheus famous-of-name'). He is not mentioned by Homer or Hesiod. Most ancient sources accept his historical existence; Aristotle is an exception. Pindar calls Orpheus 'the father of songs' and identifies him as a son of the Thracian mythological king Oeagrus and the Muse Calliope.

Greeks of the Classical age venerated Orpheus as the greatest of all poets and musicians; it was said that while Hermes had invented the lyre, Orpheus perfected it. Poets such as Simonides of Ceos said that Orpheus's music and singing could charm the birds, fish and wild beasts, coax the trees and rocks into dance, and divert the course of rivers.

Orpheus was one of the handful of Greek heroes to visit the Underworld and return; his music and song had power even over Hades. The earliest known reference to this descent to the underworld is the painting by Polygnotus (5th century BC) described by Pausanias (2nd century AD), where no mention is made of Eurydice. Euripides and Plato both refer to the story of his descent to recover his wife, but do not mention her name; a contemporary relief (about 400 BC) shows Orpheus and his wife with Hermes. The elegiac poet Hermesianax called her Agriope; and the first mention of her name in literature is in the Lament for Bion (1st century BC)

Some sources credit Orpheus with further gifts to humankind: medicine, which is more usually under the auspices of Asclepius (Aesculapius) or Apollo; writing, which is usually credited to Cadmus; and agriculture, where Orpheus assumes the Eleusinian role of Triptolemus as giver of Demeter's knowledge to humankind. Orpheus was an augur and seer; he practiced magical arts and astrology, founded cults to Apollo and Dionysus and prescribed the mystery rites preserved in Orphic texts. Pindar and Apollonius of Rhodes place Orpheus as the harpist and companion of Jason and the Argonauts. Orpheus had a brother named Linus, who went to Thebes and became a Theban. He is claimed by Aristophanes and Horace to have taught cannibals to subsist on fruit, and to have made lions and tigers obedient to him. Horace believed, however, that Orpheus had only introduced order and civilization to savages.

Strabo (64 BC – c. AD 24) presents Orpheus as a mortal, who lived and died in a village close to Olympus. "Some, of course, received him willingly, but others, since they suspected a plot and violence, combined against him and killed him." He made money as a musician and "wizard" – Strabo uses , also used by Sophocles in Oedipus Tyrannus to characterize Tiresias as a trickster with an excessive desire for possessions.  most often meant charlatan and always had a negative connotation.

"Orpheus...is repeatedly referred to by Euripides, in whom we find the first allusion to the connection of Orpheus with Dionysus and the infernal regions: he speaks of him as related to the Muses (Rhesus 944, 946); mentions the power of his song over rocks, trees, and wild beasts (Medea 543, Iphigenia in Aulis 1211, Bacchae 561, and a jocular allusion in Cyclops 646); refers to his charming the infernal powers (Alcestis 357); connects him with Bacchanalian orgies (Hippolytus 953); ascribes to him the origin of sacred mysteries (Rhesus 943), and places the scene of his activity among the forests of Olympus (Bacchae 561.)" "Euripides [also] brought Orpheus into his play Hypsipyle, which dealt with the Lemnian episode of the Argonautic voyage; Orpheus there acts as coxswain, and later as guardian in Thrace of Jason's children by Hypsipyle."

"He is mentioned once only, but in an important passage, by Aristophanes (Frogs 1032), who enumerates, as the oldest poets, Orpheus, Musaeus, Hesiod, and Homer, and makes Orpheus the teacher of religious initiations and of abstinence from murder..."

"Plato (Apology, Protagoras),...frequently refers to Orpheus, his followers, and his works. He calls him the son of Oeagrus (Symposium), mentions him as a musician and inventor (Ion and  Laws bk 3.), refers to the miraculous power of his lyre (Protagoras), and gives a singular version of the story of his descent into Hades: the gods, he says, imposed upon the poet, by showing him only a phantasm of his lost wife, because he had not the courage to die, like Alcestis, but contrived to enter Hades alive, and, as a further punishment for his cowardice, he met his death at the hands of women (Symposium.)"

"Earlier than the literary references is a sculptured representation of Orpheus with the ship Argo, found at Delphi, said to be of the sixth century BC."

Four other people are traditionally called Orpheus: "The second Orpheus was an Arcadian, or, according to others, a Ciconian, from the Thracian Bisaltia, and is said to be more ancient than Homer and the Trojan War. He composed fabulous figments called mythpoeai and epigrams. The third Orpheus was of Odrysius, a city of Thrace, near the river Hebrus; but Dionysius in Suidas denies his existence. The fourth Orpheus was of Crotonia; flourished in the time of Pisistratus, about the fiftieth Olympiad, and is, I have no doubt, the same with Onomacritus, who changed the dialect of these hymns. He wrote Decennalia, and in the opinion of Gyraldlus the Argonautics, which are now extant under the name of Orpheus, with other writings called Orphical, but which according to Cicero some ascribe to Cecrops the Pythagorean. But the last Orpheus [the fifth] was Camarinseus, a most excellent versifier; and the same, according to Gyraldus, whose descent into Hades is so universally known."

Writings 

On the writings of Orpheus, Freeman, in the 1946 edition of The Pre- Socratic Philosophers pp. 4–8, writes:

"In the fifth and fourth centuries BC, there existed a collection of hexametric poems known as Orphic, which were the accepted authority of those who followed the Orphic way of life, and were by them attributed to Orpheus himself. Plato several times quotes lines from this collection; he refers in the Republic to a "mass of books of Musaeus and Orpheus", and in the Laws to the hymns of Thamyris and Orpheus, while in the Ion he groups Orpheus with Musaeus and Homer as the source of inspiration of epic poets and elocutionists. Euripides in the Hippolytus makes Theseus speak of the "turgid outpourings of many treatises", which have led his son to follow Orpheus and adopt the Bacchic religion. Alexis, the fourth century comic poet, depicting Linus offering a choice of books to Heracles, mentions "Orpheus, Hesiod, tragedies, Choerilus, Homer, Epicharmus". Aristotle did not believe that the poems were by Orpheus; he speaks of the "so-called Orphic epic", and Philoponus (seventh century AD) commenting on this expression, says that in the De Philosophia (now lost) Aristotle directly stated his opinion that the poems were not by Orpheus. Philoponus adds his own view that the doctrines were put into epic verse by Onomacritus. Aristotle when quoting the Orphic cosmological doctrines attributes them to "the theologoi", "the ancient poets", "those who first theorized about the gods".

Nothing is known of any ancient Orphic writings except a reference in the Alcestis of Euripides to certain Thracian tablets which "the voice of Orpheus had inscribed" with pharmaceutical lore. The Scholiast, commenting on the passage, says that there exist on Mt. Haemus certain writings of Orpheus on tablets. There is also a reference, not mentioning Orpheus by name, in the pseudo-Platonic Axiochus, where it is said that the fate of the soul in Hades is described on certain bronze tablets which two seers had brought to Delos from the land of the Hyperboreans. This is the only evidence for any ancient Orphic writings. Aelian (second century AD) gave the chief reason against believing in them: at the time when Orpheus is said to have lived, the Thracians knew nothing about writing.

It came therefore to be believed that Orpheus taught, but left no writings, and that the epic poetry attributed to him was written in the sixth century BC by Onomacritus. Onomacritus was banished from Athens by Hipparchus for inserting something of his own into an oracle of Musaeus when entrusted with the editing of his poems. It may have been Aristotle who first suggested, in the lost De Philosophia, that Onomacritus also wrote the so-called Orphic epic poems. By the time when the Orphic writings began to be freely quoted by Christian and Neo-Platonist writers, the theory of the authorship of Onomacritus was accepted by many.

It is believed, however, that the Orphic literature current in the time of the Neo-Platonists (third century AD), and quoted by them as the authority for Orphic doctrines, was a collection of writings of different periods and varying outlook, something like that of the Bible. The earliest of these were composed in the sixth century by Onomacritus from genuine Orphic tradition; the latest which have survived, namely the Voyage of the Argonauts, and the Hymns to various deities, cannot have been put together in their present form until the beginning of the Christian era, and are probably to be dated some time between the second and fourth centuries AD.

The Neo-Platonists quote the Orphic poems in their defence against Christianity, because Plato used poems which he believed to be Orphic. It is believed that in the collection of writings which they used there were several versions, each of which gave a slightly different account of the origin of the universe, of gods and men, and perhaps of the correct way of life, with the rewards and punishments attached thereto. Three principal versions are recognized by modern scholars; all three are mentioned by the Neo-Platonist Damascius (fifth to sixth centuries AD).

These are:
 Rhapsodiae, epic lays, said by Damascius to give the usual Orphic theology. These are mentioned also in Suidas's list, as "sacred discourses in twenty-four lays", though he attributes this work to Theognetus the Thessalian (unknown) or Cercops the Pythagorean. This is now referred to as the Rhapsodic Theogony. It is the version usually quoted by ancient authorities, but was not the one used by Plato, and is therefore some-times thought to have been composed after he wrote; this question cannot at present be decided.
 An Orphic Theogony given by Aristotle's pupil Eudemus.
 An Orphic Theogony "according to Hieronymus and Hellanicus". Other versions were: a Theogony put into the mouth of Orpheus by Apollonius Rhodius in his Argonautica an Orphic Theogony quoted by Alexander of Aphrodisias; and a Theogony in Clement of Rome, not specified as Orphic, but belonging to the same school of thought.

A long list of Orphic works is given in Suidas (tenth century AD); but most of these are there attributed to other authors.

They are:
 Triagmoi, attributed to the tragic poet Ion, in which there was said to be a chapter called Sacred Vestments, or Cosmic Invocations. The title Triagmoi apparently referred to "the Orphic tripod of three elements, earth, water, fire", referred to by Ausonius and Galen; the latter said that this doctrine was given by Onomacritus in his Orphic poems.
 The Sacred Discourses, already discussed, usually identified with the Rhapsodiae.
 Oracles and Rites, attributed to Onomacritus.
 Aids to Salvation, ascribed to Timocles of Syracuse or Persinus of Miletus; both the work and these writers are otherwise unknown.
 Mixing-bowls, ascribed to Zopyrus of Heracleia; and The Robe and The Net, also ascribed to Zopyrus, or to Brontinus the Pythagorean. The Net referred to is the net of the body, so called in Orphic literature. To Brontinus was also ascribed a Physica, otherwise unknown.
 Enthronement of the Mother, and Bacchic Rites, ascribed to Nicias of Elea, of whom nothing else is known. "Enthronement" was part of the rite of initiation practised by the Corybantes, the worshippers of Rhea or Cybele; the person to be initiated was seated on a high chair, and the celebrants danced round him in a ring. The title therefore apparently means "the enthronement-ceremonies as practised by the worshippers of the Great Mother". Connected, perhaps identical with, this was a treatise on Corybantic Rites, quoted by the late Orphic poem Argonautica.
 A Descent into Hades, ascribed to Herodicus of Perinthus, or to Cercops the Pythagorean, or to the unknown Prodicus of Samos.
 Other treatises were: an Astronomy or Astrology, otherwise unknown; Sacrificial Rites, doubtless giving rules for bloodless sacrifices; Divination by means of sand, Divination by means of eggs; on Temple-building (otherwise unknown); On the girding on of Sacred Robes; and On Stones, said to contain a chapter on the carving of precious stones entitled The Eighty Stones; a version of this work, of late date, survives. It treats of the properties of stones, precious and ordinary, and their uses in divination. The Orphic Hymns are also mentioned in Suidas's list, and a Theogony in 1200 verses, perhaps one of those versions which differed from the Rhapsodiae. There was also an Orphic Word-book, doubtless a glossary of the special terms used in the cult, some of which were strange because of their allegorical usage, others because of their antiquity; this also was said to have been in verse.

Such was the list of works finally classed as Orphic writings, though it was known in early times that many of them were the works of Pythagoreans and other writers. Herodotus said of the so-called "Orphic and Bacchic rites" that they were actually "Egyptian and Pythagorean"; and Ion of Chios said that Pythagoras himself attributed some of his writings to Orpheus. Others, as has been said, regarded the earliest epics as the work of Onomacritus. The original Hymns were thought to have been composed by Orpheus, and written down, with emendations, by Musaeus. There were also other writers named Orpheus: to one, of Croton, said to be a contemporary and associate of Peisistratus, were attributed two epic poems: an Argonautica, and The Twelve-year Cycle (probably astrological); to another, Orpheus of Camarina, an epic Descent into Hades. These namesakes are probably inventions."

Mythology

Early life

According to Apollodorus and a fragment of Pindar, Orpheus's father was Oeagrus, a Thracian king, or, according to another version of the story, the god Apollo. His mother was (1) the muse Calliope, (2) her sister Polymnia, (3) a daughter of Pierus, son of Makednos or (4) lastly of Menippe, daughter of Thamyris. According to Tzetzes, he was from Bisaltia. His birthplace and place of residence was Pimpleia close to the Olympus. Strabo mentions that he lived in Pimpleia. According to the epic poem Argonautica, Pimpleia was the location of Oeagrus's and Calliope's wedding. 

While living with his mother and her eight beautiful sisters in Parnassus, he met Apollo, who was courting the laughing muse Thalia. Apollo, as the god of music, gave Orpheus a golden lyre and taught him to play it. Orpheus's mother taught him to make verses for singing. He is also said to have studied in Egypt.

Orpheus is said to have established the worship of Hecate in Aegina. Also in Taygetos a wooden image of Orpheus was said to have been kept by Pelasgians in the sanctuary of the Eleusinian Demeter.

According to Diodorus Siculus, Musaeus of Athens was the son of Orpheus.

Adventure as an Argonaut

The Argonautica is a Greek epic poem written by Apollonius Rhodius in the 3rd century BC. Orpheus took part in this adventure and used his skills to aid his companions. Chiron told Jason that without the aid of Orpheus, the Argonauts would never be able to pass the Sirens—the same Sirens encountered by Odysseus in Homer's epic poem the Odyssey. The Sirens lived on three small, rocky islands called Sirenum scopuli and sang beautiful songs that enticed sailors to come to them, which resulted in the crashing of their ships into the islands. When Orpheus heard their voices, he drew his lyre and played music that was louder and more beautiful, drowning out the Sirens' bewitching songs. According to 3rd century BC Hellenistic elegiac poet Phanocles, Orpheus loved the young Argonaut Calais, "the son of Boreas, with all his heart, and went often in shaded groves still singing of his desire, nor was his heart at rest. But always, sleepless cares wasted his spirits as he looked at fresh Calais."

Death of Eurydice

The most famous story in which Orpheus figures is that of his wife Eurydice (sometimes referred to as Euridice and also known as Argiope). While walking among her people, the Cicones, in tall grass at her wedding, Eurydice was set upon by a satyr. In her efforts to escape the satyr, Eurydice fell into a nest of vipers and suffered a fatal bite on her heel. Her body was discovered by Orpheus who, overcome with grief, played such sad and mournful songs that all the nymphs and gods wept. On their advice, Orpheus traveled to the underworld. His music softened the hearts of Hades and Persephone, who agreed to allow Eurydice to return with him to earth on one condition: he should walk in front of her and not look back until they both had reached the upper world. 

Orpheus set off with Eurydice following; however, as soon as he had reached the upper world, he immediately turned to look at her, forgetting in his eagerness that both of them needed to be in the upper world for the condition to be met. As Eurydice had not yet crossed into the upper world, she vanished for the second time, this time forever.

The story in this form belongs to the time of Virgil, who first introduces the name of Aristaeus (by the time of Virgil's Georgics, the myth has Aristaeus chasing Eurydice when she was bitten by a serpent) and the tragic outcome. Other ancient writers, however, speak of Orpheus's visit to the underworld in a more negative light; according to Phaedrus in Plato's Symposium, the infernal gods only "presented an apparition" of Eurydice to him. In fact, Plato's representation of Orpheus is that of a coward, as instead of choosing to die in order to be with the one he loved, he instead mocked the gods by trying to travel alive to Hades to bring her back. Since his love was not "true"—he did not want to die for love—he was actually punished by the gods, first by giving him only the apparition of his former wife in the underworld, and then by being killed by women. In Ovid's account, however, Eurydice's death by a snake bite is incurred while she was dancing with naiads on her wedding day.

Virgil wrote in his poem that Dryads wept from Epirus and Hebrus up to the land of the Getae (north east Danube valley) and even describes him wandering into Hyperborea and Tanais (ancient Greek city in the Don river delta) due to his grief.

The story of Eurydice may actually be a late addition to the Orpheus myths. In particular, the name Eurudike ("she whose justice extends widely") recalls cult-titles attached to Persephone. According to the theories of poet Robert Graves, the myth may have been derived from another Orpheus legend, in which he travels to Tartarus and charms the goddess Hecate.

The myth theme of not looking back, an essential precaution in Jason's raising of chthonic Brimo Hekate under Medea's guidance, is reflected in the Biblical story of Lot's wife when escaping from Sodom. More directly, the story of Orpheus is similar to the ancient Greek tales of Persephone captured by Hades and similar stories of Adonis captive in the underworld. However, the developed form of the Orpheus myth was entwined with the Orphic mystery cults and, later in Rome, with the development of Mithraism and the cult of Sol Invictus.

Death

According to a Late Antique summary of Aeschylus's lost play Bassarids, Orpheus, towards the end of his life, disdained the worship of all gods except Apollo. One early morning he went to the oracle of Dionysus at Mount Pangaion to salute his god at dawn, but was ripped to shreds by Thracian Maenads for not honoring his previous patron (Dionysus) and was buried in Pieria.

But having gone down into Hades because of his wife and seeing what sort of things were there, he did not continue to worship Dionysus, because of whom he was famous, but he thought Helios to be the greatest of the gods, Helios whom he also addressed as Apollo. Rousing himself each night toward dawn and climbing the mountain called Pangaion, he would await the Sun's rising, so that he might see it first. Therefore, Dionysus, being angry with him, sent the Bassarides, as Aeschylus the tragedian says; they tore him apart and scattered the limbs.

Here his death is analogous with that of Pentheus, who was also torn to pieces by Maenads; and it has been speculated that the Orphic mystery cult regarded Orpheus as a parallel figure to or even an incarnation of Dionysus. Both made similar journeys into Hades, and Dionysus-Zagreus suffered an identical death. Pausanias writes that Orpheus was buried in Dion and that he met his death there. 
He writes that the river Helicon sank underground when the women that killed Orpheus tried to wash off their blood-stained hands in its waters. Other legends claim that Orpheus became a follower of Dionysus and spread his cult across the land. In this version of the legend, it is said that Orpheus was torn to shreds by the women of Thrace for his inattention.

Ovid recounts that Orpheus ... 
 
Feeling spurned by Orpheus for taking only male lovers (eromenoi), the Ciconian women, followers of Dionysus, first threw sticks and stones at him as he played, but his music was so beautiful even the rocks and branches refused to hit him. Enraged, the women tore him to pieces during the frenzy of their Bacchic orgies. In Albrecht Dürer's drawing of Orpheus's death, based on an original, now lost, by Andrea Mantegna, a ribbon high in the tree above him is lettered Orfeus der erst puseran ("Orpheus, the first pederast").

His head, still singing mournful songs, floated along with his lyre down the River Hebrus into the sea, after which the winds and waves carried them to the island of Lesbos, at the city of Methymna; there, the inhabitants buried his head and a shrine was built in his honour near Antissa; there his oracle prophesied, until it was silenced by Apollo. In addition to the people of Lesbos, Greeks from Ionia and Aetolia consulted the oracle, and his reputation spread as far as Babylon.
   

Orpheus's lyre was carried to heaven by the Muses, and was placed among the stars. The Muses also gathered up the fragments of his body and buried them at Leibethra below Mount Olympus, where the nightingales sang over his grave. After the river Sys flooded Leibethra, the Macedonians took his bones to Dion. Orpheus's soul returned to the underworld, to the fields of the Blessed, where he was reunited at last with his beloved Eurydice.

Another legend places his tomb at Dion, near Pydna in Macedon. In another version of the myth, Orpheus travels to Aornum in Thesprotia, Epirus to an old oracle for the dead. In the end Orpheus commits suicide from his grief unable to find Eurydice.

"Others said that he was the victim of a thunderbolt."

Orphic poems and rites

A number of Greek religious poems in hexameters were attributed to Orpheus, as they were to similar miracle-working figures, like Bakis, Musaeus, Abaris, Aristeas, Epimenides, and the Sibyl. Of this vast literature, only three significant works survived: the Orphic Hymns, a set of 87 poems, possibly composed at some point in the second or third century, the epic Orphic Argonautica, composed somewhere between the fourth and sixth centuries, and the Lithica, about the properties of stones. Earlier Orphic literature, which may date back as far as the sixth century BC, survives only in papyrus fragments or in quotations. Some of the earliest fragments may have been composed by Onomacritus.

In addition to serving as a storehouse of mythological data along the lines of Hesiod's Theogony, Orphic poetry was recited in mystery-rites and purification rituals. Plato in particular tells of a class of vagrant beggar-priests who would go about offering purifications to the rich, a clatter of books by Orpheus and Musaeus in tow. Those who were especially devoted to these rituals and poems often practiced vegetarianism and abstention from sex, and refrained from eating eggs and beans—which came to be known as the Orphikos bios, or "Orphic way of life".

The Derveni papyrus, found in Derveni, Macedonia (Greece) in 1962, contains a philosophical treatise that is an allegorical commentary on an Orphic poem in hexameters, a theogony concerning the birth of the gods, produced in the circle of the philosopher Anaxagoras, written in the second half of the fifth century BC. Fragments of the poem are quoted making it "the most important new piece of evidence about Greek philosophy and religion to come to light since the Renaissance". The papyrus dates to around 340 BC, during the reign of Philip II of Macedon, making it Europe's oldest surviving manuscript.

The historian William Mitford wrote in 1784 that the very earliest form of a higher and more cohesive ancient Greek religion was manifest in the Orphic poems. W. K. C. Guthrie wrote that Orpheus was the founder of mystery religions and the first to reveal to men the meanings of the initiation rites.

Post-Classical interpretations

Classical music
The Orpheus motif has permeated Western culture and has been used as a theme in all art forms. Early examples include the Breton lai Sir Orfeo from the early 13th century and musical interpretations like Jacopo Peri's Euridice (1600, though titled with his wife's name, the libretto is based entirely upon books X and XI of Ovid's Metamorphoses and therefore Orpheus's viewpoint is predominant).

Subsequent operatic interpretations include:
 Claudio Monteverdi's L'Orfeo (1607)
 Luigi Rossi's Orfeo (1647)
 Marc-Antoine Charpentier's La descente d'Orphée aux enfers H.488 (1686). Charpentier also composed a cantata, Orphée descendant aux enfers H.471, (1683)
 Christoph Willibald Gluck's Orfeo ed Euridice (1762)
 Joseph Haydn's last opera L'anima del filosofo, ossia Orfeo ed Euridice (1791)
 Franz Liszt's symphonic poem Orpheus (1854)
 Jacques Offenbach's operetta Orphée aux Enfers (1858)
 Igor Stravinsky's ballet Orpheus (1948)
 David Maslanka's work for two bassoons and marimba Orpheus (1977)
 Two operas by Harrison Birtwistle: The Mask of Orpheus (1973–1984) and The Corridor (2009)
 The Bulgarian Rousse State Opera commissioned and performed Orpheus: A Masque by John Robertson (2015)
 Fabio Mengozzi's electronic poem Orpheus (2022).

Literature
Rainer Maria Rilke's Sonnets to Orpheus (1922) are based on the Orpheus myth. Poul Anderson's Hugo Award-winning novelette "Goat Song", published in 1972, is a retelling of the story of Orpheus in a science fiction setting. Some feminist interpretations of the myth give Eurydice greater weight. Margaret Atwood's Orpheus and Eurydice Cycle (1976–86) deals with the myth, and gives Eurydice a more prominent voice. Sarah Ruhl's Eurydice likewise presents the story of Orpheus's descent to the underworld from Eurydice's perspective. Ruhl removes Orpheus from the center of the story by pairing their romantic love with the paternal love of Eurydice's dead father. David Almond's 2014 novel, A Song for Ella Grey, was inspired by the myth of Orpheus and Eurydice, and won the Guardian Children's Fiction Prize in 2015. 
The 2014 novel Orfeo by Richard Powers is based on Orpheus.
The 2020 novel Orpheus' Temptation by Stefan Calin is based on an allegory between the main character and Orpheus's descent into the Underworld and subsequent temptation to look at Eurydice.

Dino Buzzati adapted the Orpheus motif in his graphic novel Poem Strip (1969). Neil Gaiman depicts his version of Orpheus in The Sandman comics series (1989–2015). Gaiman's Orpheus is the son of Oneiros (the Dream Lord Morpheus) and the muse Calliope.

The poet Gabriele Tinti has composed a series of poems inspired by the myth of Orpheus, read by Robert Davi at the J. Paul Getty Museum.

Film and stage

Vinicius de Moraes's play Orfeu da Conceição (1956), later adapted by Marcel Camus in the 1959 film Black Orpheus, tells the story in the modern context of a favela in Rio de Janeiro during Carnaval. Jean Cocteau's Orphic Trilogy – The Blood of a Poet (1930), Orpheus (1950) and Testament of Orpheus (1959) – was filmed over thirty years, and is based in many ways on the story. Philip Glass adapted the second film into the chamber opera Orphée (1991), part of an homage triptych to Cocteau. Nikos Nikolaidis's 1975 film Evrydiki BA 2O37 is an innovative perspective on the classic Greek tragedy of Orpheus and Eurydice. Baz Luhrmann's 2001 jukebox musical film Moulin Rouge! is also inspired by the myth. Anaïs Mitchell's 2010 folk opera musical Hadestown retells the tragedy of Orpheus and Eurydice with a soundtrack inspired by American blues and jazz, portraying Hades as the brutal work-boss of an underground mining city. Mitchell, together with director Rachel Chavkin, later adapted her album into a multiple Tony award-winning stage musical. Sarah Ruhl's play Eurydice examines the myth from the perspective of Eurydice, and the myth features as one of the tales told in Mary Zimmerman's play Metamorphoses. In 2022 the Dutch National Opera presented Orphee l'Amour Eurydice: an adapted version of the myth. The piece made use of the Meta Quest 2 headset, and allowed audiences to experience the opera through the eyes of both Orphée and Eurydice.

See also
 Aornum
 Argonautica Orphica
 Katabasis
 Leibethra
 List of Orphean operas
 Pierian Spring
 Pimpleia
 Sir Orfeo
 3361 Orpheus

Notes

Bibliography 
 Pseudo-Apollodorus, Bibliotheke I, iii, 2; ix, 16 & 25;
 Apollonius Rhodius, Argonautica I, 23–34; IV, 891–909.
 Bernabé, Albertus (ed.), Orphicorum et Orphicis similium testimonia et fragmenta. Poetae Epici Graeci. Pars II. Fasc. 1. Bibliotheca Teubneriana, München/Leipzig: K.G. Saur, 2004. . review of this book
  (with the Lithica translated to Portuguese)

 Guthrie, William Keith Chambers, Orpheus and Greek Religion: a Study of the Orphic Movement, 1935.
 
 Mitford, William, The History of Greece, 1784. Cf. v.1, Chapter II, Religion of the Early Greeks.
 Moore, Clifford H., Religious Thought of the Greeks, 1916. Kessinger Publishing (April 2003). 
 Ossoli, Margaret Fuller, Orpheus, a sonnet about his trip to the underworld.
 Ovid, Metamorphoses X, 1–105; XI, 1–66;
 Christoph Riedweg, "Orfeo", in: S. Settis (a cura di), I Greci: Storia Cultura Arte Società, volume II, 1, Turin 1996, 1251–1280.
 Christoph Riedweg, "Orpheus oder die Magie der musiké. Antike Variationen eines einflussreichen Mythos", in: Th. Fuhrer / P. Michel / P. Stotz (Hgg.), Geschichten und ihre Geschichte, Basel 2004, 37–66.
 Rohde, Erwin, Psyche, 1925. cf. Chapter 10, The Orphics.
 
 Smith, William; Dictionary of Greek and Roman Biography and Mythology, London (1873). "Orpheus" 
 Taylor, Thomas [translator], The Mystical Hymns of Orpheus, 1896.
 West, Martin L., The Orphic Poems, 1983. There is a sub-thesis in this work that early Greek religion was heavily influenced by Central Asian shamanistic practices. One major point of contact was the ancient Crimean city of Olbia.
 Wise, R. Todd, A Neocomparative Examination of the Orpheus Myth As Found in the Native American and European Traditions, 1998. UMI. The thesis explores Orpheus as a single mythic structure present in traditions that extend from antiquity to contemporary times and across cultural contexts.
 Wroe, Ann, Orpheus: The Song of Life, The Overlook Press, New York, 2012.

External links

 Greek Mythology Link, Orpheus
 Theoi Project: online text: The Orphic Hymns translated by Thomas Taylor
 The Life and Theology of Orpheus by Thomas Taylor, including several Orphic Hymns and their accompanying notes by Taylor
 Orphica in English and Greek (select resources)
 Leibethra – The Tomb of Orpheus (in Greek)
 Warburg Institute Iconographic Database (ca. 400 images of Orpheus) 
 Greek Myth Comix: The Story of Orpheus A detailed comic-strip retelling of Orpheus by Greek Myth Comix
 Orphicorum fragmenta, Otto Kern (ed.), Berolini apud Weidmannos, 1922.
 

Musicians in Greek mythology
Heroes who ventured to Hades
Argonauts
Children of Apollo
Demigods in classical mythology
Characters in the Argonautica
Founders of religions
Thracian characters in Greek mythology
 
Pederasty in ancient Greece
LGBT themes in Greek mythology
Katabasis